Clement Kofi Humado (born 18 December 1953) is the Member of Parliament for the Anlo constituency in Ghana. He is also a former Minister for Food and Agriculture in Ghana.

Early life and education
Humado was born to the late John Kobla Humado and his wife Grace Abla Humado. They both hailed from Alakple in the Keta Municipality of the Volta Region of Ghana. He graduated from the University of Ghana at Legon in 1976 where he studied Animal Science and Agricultural Extension. He obtained a Graduate Diploma in Agricultural Administration four years later at the same university. In 1985, he completed a Certificate in Monitoring and Evaluation of Public Sector Projects and Programmes course at the University of East Anglia, Norwich, England. He also did other Certificate coursed in 1989 at the Ghana Institute of Management and Public Administration and in Finance in 1998 at the University of Reading in the United Kingdom.

Career
Humado has worked in various capacities and as a consultant in agriculture and finance in various organisations such as U SAID WEST ADRICA. He was also the Head monitoring and Evaluation Deputy Project manager for International Fund for Agricultural Development from 1991 to 1999. He was also the National Officer for World Food Program from 1990 to 1991.

Politics
He entered politics in 2000 when he joined the Alakple branch of the National Democratic Congress. He won the Anlo parliamentary seat in the December 2004 parliamentary election. He was appointed by President Mills during a cabinet reshuffle in January 2011. He was also appointed the Minister for youth and Sports by former President Atta-Mills. He was the former Minister for Agriculture.

Personal life 
He is a Christian and worships as a Catholic. He is married with 5 children.

See also
Anlo (Ghana parliament constituency)
List of Mills government ministers
National Democratic Congress

References

External links
 Profile on GhanaDistricts.com

1953 births
Living people
Ghanaian Roman Catholics
University of Ghana alumni
National Democratic Congress (Ghana) politicians
Government ministers of Ghana
Agriculture ministers of Ghana
Ghanaian MPs 2005–2009
Ghanaian MPs 2009–2013
Ghanaian MPs 2013–2017